Penny Vital (born July 20, 1977), better known as Penny Drake, is an American independent film actress and model. Her modelling career since 2008 has included work for Herra Couture, Flora Zeta and Ed Hardy. In June 2009 she appeared as the video game character Bayonetta at the Electronic Entertainment Expo (E3) in Los Angeles.

Penny's movie appearances since 2005 include parts in Sin City and The 40 Year Old Virgin. She also stars in Zombie Strippers alongside Jenna Jameson and Robert Englund, and in Necrosis played with Michael Berryman and George Stults.

In 2006–2008 she played co-anchor Mary Clark in the Bikini News Web-based satirical video series.

Personal life
Drake's father is a Southern Baptist pastor.

Filmography
 The 40 Year Old Virgin (2005)
 Sin City (2005)
 Monarch of the Moon (2005)
 The Slaughter (2006)
 You're So Dead (2007)
 The Cook (2008)
 Zombie Strippers! (2008)
 Necrosis (2009)
 Dreamkiller (2010)

Television
 2008: "Star Chicks"

References

External links
 
 Zombie Good Life (artistic)
 Penny Vital (deprecated )  
  

1977 births
American film actresses
Actresses from San Antonio
Living people
Female models from Texas
21st-century American women